Shuifu is a county-level city under the jurisdiction of the prefecture-level city of Zhaotong, in the northeast of Yunnan province, China, bordering Sichuan to the east and northeast across the Jinsha River.

History 
Shuifu has only 25 years of history. It used to belong to Sichuan province, but it is now in Yunnan province.

Administrative divisions
Shuifu City has 1 subdistrict and 3 towns. 
1 subdistrict
 Yunfu
3 towns
 Xiangjiaba
 Taiping
 Liangwan

Agriculture 

Rice, corn, pears.

Transportation 
There is a train-station outside the town itself. The Jinsha River passes by it. Many roads are connected to the town, and a huge freeway was under construction in 2006.

References

External links
Official Site

County-level divisions of Zhaotong
Cities in Yunnan